Alejandro Rubén Apud Varela (born 22 October 1967 in Montevideo) is a Uruguayan football manager and former player who played as a goalkeeper.

Career
Apud played as a goalkeeper for Uruguayan clubs Centro Atlético Fénix, Club Nacional de Football, Liverpool F.C. (Montevideo) and Rampla Juniors.

After he retired from playing, Apud became a football manager. He led Sud América, Liverpool F.C. (Montevideo) and Atenas de San Carlos, before being appointed manager of Boston River during its first season in the Uruguayan Primera División, earning a place in the 2017 Copa Sudamericana.

References

External links
 Website
 

1967 births
Living people
Uruguayan footballers
Uruguayan people of Arab descent
Centro Atlético Fénix players
Club Nacional de Football players
Liverpool F.C. (Montevideo) players
Rampla Juniors players
People from Montevideo
Association football goalkeepers
Uruguayan football managers
C.A. Cerro managers
Sud América managers
Liverpool F.C. (Montevideo) managers
Boston River managers
Racing Club de Montevideo managers
Academia Deportiva Cantolao managers
Uruguayan expatriate football managers
Uruguayan expatriate sportspeople in Peru
Expatriate football managers in Peru
Ayacucho FC managers
Juventud de Las Piedras managers